Spring Mills is an unincorporated community in Appomattox County, Virginia, United States.

Blenheim was listed on the National Register of Historic Places in 1979, with a boundary increase in 1994.

References

GNIS reference

Unincorporated communities in Virginia
Unincorporated communities in Appomattox County, Virginia